Jean "Johnny" Pigozzi (born 1952),  heir to the CEO of the automobile brand Simca, is an art collector, photographer and fashion designer. He lives in Geneva.

Biography 
Pigozzi is a "French-born Italian". He was born in Paris in 1952 and is the son of Henri Pigozzi, industry captain at the head of the Simca automobile (created by Fiat) brand from July 1935 to May 1963. Pigozzi studied at Harvard University before working for the Gaumont Film Company and 20th Century Fox.

Art collection
Pigozzi started collecting contemporary African art after visiting the show "Magiciens de la Terre" at the Pompidou Center and Grande Halle de la Villette in Paris in 1989. He has since assembled the world's largest private collection of contemporary African art, together with French curator André Magnin. It is known as the Contemporary African Art Collection (CAAC – the Pigozzi Collection (www.caacart.com), and is based in Geneva. It doesn't have a permanent venue opened to the public, but has been exhibited in over sixty museums and art events around the world, such as the Museum of Fine Arts in Houston; the Grimaldi Forum in Monaco; the National Museum of African Art in Washington D.C.; the Guggenheim Museum in Bilbao, Spain; the Pinacoteca Giovanni and Marella Agnelli in Turin, Italy; the Tate Modern in London; the Cartier Foundation in Paris, Paris, the Grand Palais in Paris, the Louis Vuitton Fondation in Paris, The MoMA in NY, The Venice Biennale, Venice, Documenta, Cassel, etc.

In 2006, he also started the JaPigozzi Collection of contemporary Japanese art  (japigozzi.com) by young Japanese artists.

In July 2019, Jean Pigozzi donated 45 contemporary African artworks to the MoMA by the following artists: Frédéric Bruly Bouabré, Jean Depara, Romuald Hazoumè, Seydou Keïta, Bodys Isek Kingelez, Abu Bakarr Mansaray, Moké, Ambroise Ngaimoko, Paramount Photographers Ltd, and Chéri Samba.

Photography 
Pigozzi began taking pictures age seven. Since then, he never stopped photographing everything around him, which meant friends, dogs, icebergs, himself and a great many celebrities. His first solo exhibition of photography was at Musée d’art moderne, Paris (1974). His photographs have since been shown worldwide.

Exhibitions

1974: Musée d’Art Moderne, Paris
1980: Light Gallery, New York
1991: A Short Visit to Planet Earth, Gagosian Gallery, New York
2008: Pigozzi and the Paparazzi, Helmut Newton Foundation, Berlin
2010: Rencontres d'Arles festival, France
2010: Johnny Stop!, Gagosian Gallery, New York, 2010; Colette, Paris, 2010; SEM-ART Gallery, Monaco, 2012.
2010: Clic Gallery, St. Barths
2011: Pigozzi, STOP ! You're too close, Multimedia Art Museum, Moscow
2012: Unseen International Art Fair, Galerie Alex Daniels-REFLEX, Amsterdam
2013: Johnny's Diary - Photographies de Jean Pigozzi, Galerie du Jour, Agnesb, Paris
2013: Photographs featured in a film short directed by Brett Ratner for Vanity Fair's 100th Anniversary.
2014: My World, Jean Pigozzi, Ullens Center for Contemporary Art, Beijing
2016: Johnny's Pool, Jean Pigozzi, Gagosian Gallery, New York City, 2016; The Baker Museum, Naples, Florida, 2016; Galerie Gmurzynska, St. Moritz, Switzerland, 2017; Helmut Newton Foundation, Berlin, Germany,
2017:Galerie Gmurzynska, St. Moritz (2017), and the Helmut Newton Foundation in Berlin.
2018:Scai The Bathhouse, Tokyo (2018), Immagis Fine Art Photography, Munich, and Pilevneli Gallery, Istanbul

Fashion
In 2007, Pigozzi created a clothing and accessories line featuring bright colors and prints called LimoLand, with the intention of designing clothing for those who “Live to Create”. He is also the creative director of the brand. As of 2010, LimoLine was sold in upscale department stores such as Bloomingdale's, Barneys New York, Bergdorf Goodman, and Nordstrom and had a boutique store in New York City. Pigozzi draws the sketches and outsources the technical aspects of the design and creation of his line.

Television show 
"My Friends call Me Johnny" (2014) an interview program, debuted September 3, 2014 on Esquire Network.

Publications of photography books by Pigozzi

A Short Visit to Planet Earth: Photographs. New York: Aperture, 1991. .
Pigozzi's Journal of the Seventies. Doubleday, 1979. With an introduction by Jann Wenner. .
Catalogue Deraisonne. Steidldangin, 2010. .
Pool Party. Rizzoli, 2016. .
Me+Co, 2017, Damiani, 
Charles and Saatchi: The Dogs, 2018, Damiani, 
The 223 Most Important Men in My Life, 2019, Damiani,

Publications by others

Arts of Africa: The Contemporary Collection of Jean Pigozzi. 2005. André Magnin. .
African Art Now: Masterpieces from the Jean Pigozzi Collection. 2005. André Magnin; Alison De Lima Greene; Alvia Wardlaw; Thomas McEvilley. .
Jean Pigozzi, dans la peau d'un collectionneur, Catherine Grenier, 2017, Flammarion, 
Les Initiés, Un choix d'oeuvres dans la collection d'art contemporain africain de Jean Pigozzi, 2017, Dilecta, Fondation Louis Vuitton,

References

External links
Pigozzi's official personal website
Contemporary African Art Collection (CAAC) www.caacart.com

1952 births
Harvard University alumni
Italian art collectors
20th-century Italian businesspeople
Italian philanthropists
Living people
Historians of African art
21st-century Italian businesspeople
21st-century philanthropists
Businesspeople from Paris